Christ Church  on Holmen (Kristkirken på Holmen i Bergen) was the main medieval era cathedral of Bergen, Norway. Its site was near Haakon's hall (Håkonshallen) and Bergenhus Fortress (Bergenhus festning).

History
Christ Church  was built by King Olav Kyrre during the period 1066–1093.  In 1170 the relics of Saint Sunniva were moved here from Selja and placed on the main altar.
During Bergen's period as the capital of Norway in the 13th century, the area known as Holmen  contained the royal residence in Bergen, as well as Christ Church, several other churches, the bishop's residence, and a Dominican monastery. Holmen  and Christ Church formed the political centre of the country. The church itself was used for negotiations and the churchyard was used for hailing of kings and meetings of the realm. The first coronation in Scandinavia was held in Bergen in 1163 and several coronations were held in the church when it was finished. The kings were also married and buried in the church.

In 1531, the church was levelled to the ground by order of Eske Bille who was Danish commander of Bergenhus Fortress from 1529 to 1537. A similar fate happened to the city's Apostel Church. Both churches and other buildings were removed in order to strengthen the defense of the city and port and with the consent of Bishop Olav.

Coronations 
Magnus V in 1163 or 1164
Sverre on 29 June 1194
Haakon IV and Margaret Skulesdatter on 29 July 1247
Magnus VI and Ingeborg of Denmark on 14 September 1261
Eric II in 1280
Margaret of Scotland in 1281

Burials 

Saint Sunniva in 1170
Sverre in 1202
Haakon III in 1204
Haakon IV in 1263
Margaret of Scotland in 1283
Margaret, Maid of Norway, in 1290
Eric II in 1299

References

External links 
 Østenfor Nordsjøen - vestenfor Langfjella

Cathedrals in Norway
Churches completed in 1093
Churches in Bergen
Ancient Cathedrals in Norway
Coronation church buildings
Tourist attractions in Bergen
Former Roman Catholic cathedrals in Norway
11th-century Roman Catholic church buildings
11th-century churches in Norway